Michael George Bowen (23 April 1930 – 17 October 2019) was a British prelate of the Roman Catholic Church. He served as Archbishop of Southwark from 1977 to 2003, having previously served as Bishop of Arundel and Brighton.

Life and ministry
Michael Bowen was born in Gibraltar on 23 April 1930 and was a wine merchant before being ordained to the priesthood on 6 July 1958. On 18 May 1970 he was appointed Coadjutor Bishop of Arundel and Brighton and Titular Bishop of Lamsorti by Pope Paul VI. Bowen received his episcopal consecration on the following 27 June from Archbishop Domenico Enrici with bishops David Cashman and Derek Worlock serving as co-consecrators.

Bowen succeeded the late David Cashman as Bishop of Arundel and Brighton on 14 March 1971. Bowen was later named Archbishop of Southwark on 28 March 1977. He resigned this post, after 26 years of service, on 6 November 2003. Following the announcement of his resignation, Cardinal Cormac Murphy-O'Connor said,

Bowen died on 17 October 2019, aged 89.

References

External links
Catholic-Hierarchy

1930 births
2019 deaths
Gibraltarian Roman Catholics
20th-century Roman Catholic archbishops in the United Kingdom
21st-century Roman Catholic archbishops in the United Kingdom
Roman Catholic bishops of Arundel and Brighton
Roman Catholic archbishops of Southwark
Gibraltarian emigrants to England